Kausthubham is a 2010 Malayalam-language film by Sajeev Kilikulam starring Karthika and Vijayaraghavan.

Plot
The film is the story of Yamuna (Karthika) whose life is filled with worries and sorrows. Her husband (Vijayaraghavan) is sent to jail on a false count of murder. Her three-year-old son gets lost during a temple festival and that increases her problems. She prays to Lord Krishna and the lord appears and miraculous things take place.

Cast 

 Vijayaraghavan
 Master Saikumar
 Karthika Yamuna
 Jagannatha Varma
 Sukumari
 Indrans
 Jagadeesh
 Rajmohan Unnithan
 Vijayaraghavan
 Ayyappa Baiju
 Mamukkoya
 Kochu Preman
 Anoop Chandran
paramesharan{ master}
gayathri

References

External links 
 http://www.bharatstudent.com/cafebharat/movie_reviews_2-Malayalam-Kausthubham-Movie-Review-4,1081.php
 https://www.nowrunning.com/movie/5791/malayalam/kausthubham/2512/review.htm

2010 films
2010s Malayalam-language films